The United States' National Reconnaissance Operations Center (NROC) is the focal point for the National Reconnaissance Office's current operations and for time-sensitive space-borne intelligence reporting for the United States Intelligence Community (USIC).  The NROC was created in response to the September 11th terrorist attacks.

NROC serves as a back-up to the Joint Space Operations Center (JSpOC), located at Vandenberg AFB, California. New York's 222d Command and Control Squadron (222 CACS) provides personnel augmentation to NROC.

See also
White House Situation Room
National Operations Center (NOC)
National Military Command Center (NMCC)
Alternate National Military Command Center (ANMCC)
National SIGINT Operations Center (NSOC)
Defense Special Missile & Astronautics Center (DEFSMAC)
Terrorist Threat Integration Center
222d Command and Control Squadron (New York Air National Guard)

References

Mass surveillance
National Reconnaissance Office
United States Department of Defense agencies
United States government secrecy